Vy-lo-fone is the third studio album from Shetland-based band Bongshang.

Track listing
 "Intro" - 0:28
 "Myrakle" - 3:15
 "Launderette" - 3:49
 "Grass Widow" - 5:22
 "Longer" - 3:45
 "Superfresco" - 3:32
 "Cassini" - 4:18
 "Grass Orphan" - 1:48
 "Wisdom" - 5:52
 "Kalifornia" - 1:41

Personnel
 JJ Jamieson - banjo, vocals, keyboards, samples
 Gordon Tulloch - guitar, vocals
 Leonard Scollay - fiddle
 Andrew Gray - bass guitar
 Christopher 'Kipper' Anderson - drums, percussion

Guest personnel
 Jack Robertson - pedal steel
 Ivor Polson - mandolin
 James Henry Erikson - mandolin
 Joanna Redmond - vocals

Sleeve notes

References

External links
 http://www.myspace.com/bongshang

Shetland music
Bongshang albums
1999 albums